Roswell High School may refer to:

Roswell High School (Georgia), a public high school in Roswell, Georgia
Roswell High School (New Mexico), a public high school in Roswell, New Mexico

See also
 Roswell (disambiguation)